The Namhae Expressway Branch 2, or the Namhae Expressway 2nd Branch is an expressway in South Korea, connecting Gimhae to Busan. It is Branch Line of Namhae Expressway. Former name is Buma Expressway(부마고속도로).

History 
 22 May 1978: Construction Begin
 4 September 1981: Opens to traffic.(Name: Buma Expressway)
 29 April 1992: Name is changed to Namhae 2nd Branch Expressway

Constructions

Lanes 
 4 lanes

Length 
 20.6 km

Limited Speed 
 90 km/h

List of facilities 

 IC: Interchange, JC: Junction, SA: Service Area, TG:Tollgate

External links
 MOLIT South Korean Government Transport Department

Expressways in South Korea
Roads in South Gyeongsang
Roads in Busan